The 2001 San Miguel Beermen season was the 27th season of the franchise in the Philippine Basketball Association (PBA).

Draft picks

Transactions

Championship (Finals stint)
The San Miguel Beermen contested for all three championships of the season. The Beermen won their 16th PBA title in the All-Filipino Cup by defeating Barangay Ginebra Kings in six games as they are now winners of five of the last six conferences. 

In the Commissioner's Cup, San Miguel advances to the finals by winning over Alaska Aces, three games to two, in their best-of-five semifinal series. As the odds-on favorite against sophomore team Batang Red Bull, who were making their first trip to the championship, the defending champion Beermen were surprisingly upset by the Thunder in six games. It was coach Jong Uichico's first loss in the PBA finals since handling the Beermen at the start of the 1999 season.

San Miguel was back in the finals for the fifth straight conference in the season-ending Governor's Cup with import Lamont Strothers returning to help the Beermen defend the crown they won the past two seasons. San Miguel made it via 3–0 sweep over Shell Turbo Chargers in their best-of-five semifinal series and played the Sta.Lucia Realtors for the second time in the championship of the 2000 era. The Beermen lost to the Realtors in six games and placed runner-up in the last two conferences of the 2001 season.

Award
Danny Ildefonso won the Most Valuable Player trophy for the second straight time and becoming the third PBA player to win back-to-back MVP honors, joining William "Bogs" Adornado (1975–1976) and Alvin Patrimonio (1993–1994).

Roster

 

 Team Manager: Robert Non

Elimination round

Games won

References

San Miguel Beermen seasons
San